NLS may refer to:

Computing
 NLS (computer system) or oN-Line System, a pioneering computer system by Douglas Engelbart
 National Language Support or Native Language Support, in software

Organisations
 National Language Services, South Africa
 National Longitudinal Surveys, U.S.
 National Lifeguard Service, Canada
 National Life Stories, U.K.

Business
 Non-Linear Systems, electronics manufacturer
 Nautilus, Inc., stock symbol NLS, fitness products manufacturer

Education
 North Leamington School, England
 Nottingham Law School, a law school in Nottingham, England
 National Law School of India University, Bangalore

Libraries
 National Library Service for the Blind and Print Disabled, U.S. mail circulation service
 National Library of Scotland

Science and technology
 Nuclear localization signal, in biology
 Nonlinear Schrödinger equation, in physics
 Non-linear least squares, in statistics, a method used in regression analysis

Spaceflight
 Nanosatellite Launch System, based at the University of Toronto
 National Launch System, a 1991 Space Shuttle alternative study

Transport
 Nailsea and Backwell railway station station code NLS, England
 Niles (Amtrak station) station code NLS, Michigan, United States

Other
 Nimrod Line Squadron, former military service unit at RAF Kinloss
 National League System, in English football
 Nürburgring Langstrecken Serie, a motorsport endurance series held at the Nürburgring. Formerly known as VLN (Veranstaltergemeinschaft Langstreckenpokal Nürburgring)

See also